Davao City's 1st congressional district is one of the three congressional districts of the Philippines in Davao City. It has been represented in the House of Representatives since 1987. The district covers the city's poblacion or downtown commercial core composed of 40 barangays and Talomo district that borders it to the west which consists of 14 barangays. It is currently represented in the 19th Congress by Paolo Duterte of the National Unity Party (NUP) and Hugpong sa Tawong Lungsod (HTL).

Representation history

Election results

2022

2019

2016

2013

2010

See also
Legislative districts of Davao City

References

Congressional districts of the Philippines
Politics of Davao City
1987 establishments in the Philippines
Congressional districts of the Davao Region
Constituencies established in 1987